TeamTalk or TeamTALK may refer to:

 TeamTalk, a conferencing system which people use to communicate on the Internet using VoIP and video streaming
 TEAMtalk, a UK-based football website launched in 1996
 TEAMtalk 252, a short-lived UK national commercial sports radio station, associated with the TEAMtalk website